Humberto Roa (21 February 1912 – 19 February 1986) was a Chilean footballer. He played in 12 matches for the Chile national football team from 1939 to 1945. He was also part of Chile's squad for the 1939 South American Championship.

References

External links
 

1912 births
1986 deaths
Chilean footballers
Chile international footballers
Place of birth missing
Association football defenders
Audax Italiano footballers